Caladenia flindersica is a plant in the orchid family Orchidaceae and is endemic to South Australia. It is a ground orchid with a single leaf and one or two cream-coloured flowers with thin dark red to blackish tips on the petals and sepals. It is only known from Alligator Gorge in the Mount Remarkable National Park.

Description
The flowers fade to white as they age and the petals and sepals have thin, dark red to blackish, glandular tips. The tip of the labellum curls downward and there are four or six rows of purplish, stalked calli along the mid-line of the labellum. Flowering occurs in late August and September.

Taxonomy and naming
Caladenia flindersica was first formally described in 2006 by David Jones, who gave it the name Arachnorchis flindersica and published the description in Australian Orchid Research from a specimen collected in Alligator Gorge. In 2008, Robert Bates changed the name to Caladenia flindersica. The specific epithet (flindersica) is a reference to the Flinders Ranges where this species occurs.

Distribution and habitat
This spider orchid is only known from in and near Alligator Gorge where it grows among shrubs in Eucalypt forest.

References

flindersica
Endemic orchids of Australia
Orchids of South Australia
Plants described in 2006
Taxa named by David L. Jones (botanist)
Taxa named by Robert John Bates